Slonim refers to a city in Belarus. It may also refer to:
Slonim District, of which Slonim is the administrative center
Slonim governorate, a former guberniya of the Russian Empire
Slonim Hasidic dynasty
Slonim Synagogue
Slonim or Slonimsky, a Jewish surname based on the name of the city